West Asheville End of Car Line Historic District is a national historic district located at Asheville, Buncombe County, North Carolina.  The district encompasses 24 contributing buildings in a primarily commercial section of West Asheville.  It includes a nearly continuous row of one and two-story brick and concrete block commercial buildings that date from 1916 through the mid-1930s. Their development was influenced by streetcar service along the Haywood Road corridor that operated from 1910 to 1934. Notable buildings include the separately listed Bledsoe Building, along with the Isis Theater (1937), Franklin Building (1923), Pure Oil Station (1947), Wells Building (1917), Palace Theater (1928), Great A&P Tea Company (1926), and West Asheville Post Office (1929).

It was listed on the National Register of Historic Places in 2006.

Gallery

References

Commercial buildings on the National Register of Historic Places in North Carolina
Historic districts on the National Register of Historic Places in North Carolina
Buildings and structures in Asheville, North Carolina
National Register of Historic Places in Buncombe County, North Carolina